The Komsomolskoye Oil Field is an oil field located in Mangystau Province. It was discovered in 1984 and developed by Petrom. The oil field is operated and owned by Petrom.

References 

Oil fields of Kazakhstan
Oil fields of the Soviet Union